Greatest Hits, Vol. 1 is the first greatest hits package released by American country music artist Doug Stone. Nine of the album's ten tracks were previously included on his first three studio albums; the first track, the newly recorded "Little Houses", was issued as a single in 1994, peaking at #7 on the Billboard Hot Country Singles & Tracks (now Hot Country Songs) charts. This was also his last album for Epic Records.

Track listing

Charts

Weekly charts

Year-end charts

References

1994 greatest hits albums
Doug Stone albums
Epic Records compilation albums